André Samuel Silva Pires (born 29 August 1989) is a Portuguese motorcycle racer.

Career
André Pires was the portuguese champion of 125GP in 2011, portuguese champion of Superstock 600 in 2012 and portuguese champion of Superbikes in 2014. He has seven participations in the Macau Grand Prix (best place 13th) and one on the Isle of Man TT in 2016.

Since  he competes in the MotoE World Cup.

Career statistics

Career summary

! 2021
|align=left| MotoE World Cup
|align=left| 
| 6
| 0
| 0
| 0
| 0
| 12
| 18th
|-
Sources:

Portuguese Speed Championship

Races by year 
(key)

Source:

Isle of Man TT

2016

Grand Prix motorcycle racing

By season

By class

Races by year
(key) (Races in bold indicate pole position; races in italics indicate fastest lap)

References

External links
 

1989 births
Living people
MotoE World Cup riders
Portuguese motorcycle racers
People from Vila Real, Portugal
Sportspeople from Vila Real District